The Queens Community Board 9 is a local government in the New York City borough of Queens, encompassing the neighborhoods of Richmond Hill, Woodhaven, Ozone Park and Kew Gardens. It is delimited by the Brooklyn border to the West, Park Lane and Union Turnpike to the North, Van Wyck Expressway to the East and 103rd Avenue on the South.

References

External links
Queens Community Board 9
Profile of the Community Board

Community boards of Queens